The Federal Virtual Challenge, formerly The Federal Virtual Worlds Challenge is a competition led by the Simulation and Training Technology Center (United States Army Research, Development and Engineering Command). The event is conducted in order to reach a global development community that will create innovative and interactive training and analysis solutions in virtual worlds. The inaugural event began in 2009 with the awards being conducted during March 2010 GameTech conference in Orlando, Florida.

Description 
The focus of the challenge is training or analysis capability conducted wholly in a virtual environment. The training and analysis audience includes all United States Federal Agencies including, Department of Defense, Department of Homeland Security, Department of Transportation, and Department of Health and Human Services, NASA, DOT, and many more.

Further reading 
 U.S. Army RDECOM STTC. SFC Paul Ray Smith Simulation and Training Technology Center. U.S. Army Research, Development and Engineering Command.
 Team Orlando. Gametech 2010. Defense User's GameTech. [Online] August 2009.
 Smith, Roger. Technical Papers on Modeling and Simulation - U.S. Army PEOSTRI. ModelBenders.
 Adams, Rick. Training Technology: Real Training in Virtual Worlds. MS&T Magazine. Feb 2009, 2/2009, p. 2009.
 Federal Virtual Worlds Challenge Winners Announced, United States Army Research Laboratory, 5/2011.

Research installations of the United States Army